Mark Creegan    (born as Mark Kragen) (July 31, 1864 – September 29, 1920), was a Major League Baseball outfielder who played in nine games  for the 1884 Washington Nationals of the Union Association. He also played for a number of different minor league teams in his home town of San Francisco.

External links

1864 births
1920 deaths
Major League Baseball outfielders
Baseball players from California
19th-century baseball players
Washington Nationals (UA) players
San Francisco Californias players
San Francisco Reddingtons players
Allentown Dukes players
Reading Actives players
Minneapolis Millers (baseball) players
San Francisco Star players
California of San Francisco players